O.N.A. was a Polish rock/heavy metal band, formed in 1994.

The band was formed by musicians who had previously played together: Skawiński and Traczyk were in a band named Kombi; Kraszewski previously played in Kombi and TSA.

Grzegorz Skawiński was the leader of the band and the composer. Agnieszka Chylińska was the lyric writer and the vocalist.

Discography

Albums

Compilations

Remix albums

O.N.A. in the movies

In 1997 two of the band's songs were featured in a movie Musisz żyć (You've Got to Live, directed by Konrad Szołajski, 2000): Białe ściany and Kiedy powiem sobie dość. The band members appeared as cameos in one of the scenes.

In 1997 also Mimo wszystko was featured on a soundtrack to the movie Młode Wilki 1/2 (Young Wolves 1/2), directed by Jarosław Zamojda.

Grzegorz Skawiński wrote music for the movie Ostatnia misja (Last Mission), directed by Wojciech Wójcik in 2000. There was also the song Moja odpowiedź on the soundtrack.

References

Polish rock music groups